The Ames Building is located in Boston, Massachusetts. It is sometimes ranked as the tallest building in Boston from its completion in 1893 until 1915, when the Custom House Tower was built; however, the building was never the tallest structure in Boston, as the steeple of the 1867 Church of the Covenant was much taller than the Ames Building. Nevertheless, it is considered to be Boston's first skyscraper. In 2007, the building was converted from office space to a luxury hotel. In 2020, the building was purchased by Suffolk University and converted into a residence hall.

History

Located at 1 Court Street and Washington Mall in downtown Boston, the Ames Building was designed by the architectural firm of Shepley, Rutan and Coolidge in Richardsonian Romanesque and paid for by Frederick L. Ames. It is the second tallest masonry load bearing-wall structure in the world, exceeded only by the Monadnock Building in Chicago, completed that same year. It is fourteen stories faced in granite and sandstone and includes a four story base with large arches framing the second and third floor windows resting on Romanesque columns. Upper stories feature smaller arches.  The sandstone is from the Berea formation in Ohio and was supplied by Cleveland Quarries Company. Construction completed in 1889, but interior work was not completed for occupancy until 1893. It became the corporate headquarters for the Ames families' agricultural tool company.

The Ames Building was added to the National Register of Historic Places on May 26, 1974 and later designated as a Boston Landmark by the Boston Landmarks Commission in 1993.

Renovations
After being unoccupied for eight years, Eamon O’Marah, Rich Kilstock and Seth Greenberg (Ames Hotel Partners, LLC) and Normandy Real Estate Partners for $17.7 million purchased the structure in April 2007.  Tishman Construction Corporation of New York completed renovations to the building based on a design by Cambridge Seven Associates and with oversight provided by Walsh Co. LLC of Morristown, New Jersey.

Hotel
Since 2009, the Ames Building was a luxury boutique hotel under the name of The Ames Boston Hotel. In 2019, the hotel closed and nearby Suffolk University purchased it for use as a dormitory, known as "One Court Street", which opened in the fall of 2020.

See also
National Register of Historic Places listings in northern Boston, Massachusetts

Notes

External links 
 Historic Ames Boston Hotel (Official Site)
 City of Boston, Landmarks Commission. The Ames Building Study Report, 1993

Office buildings completed in 1893
Office buildings on the National Register of Historic Places in Massachusetts
Financial District, Boston
National Register of Historic Places in Boston
Butler–Ames family
Skyscraper hotels in Boston
Office buildings in Boston